Aidan Somers (born 1945) is an Irish retired hurler who played as a right corner-back for the Wexford senior team.

Born in Rathnure, County Wexford, Somers first arrived on the inter-county scene at the age of seventeen when he first linked up with the Wexford minor team, before later joining the under-21 side. He joined the senior panel during the 1970 championship and played for just one season. Somers won one Leinster medal on the field of play.

At club level Somers is a three-time Leinster medallist with Rathnure. In addition to this he also won eight championship medals.

Honours

Team

Rathnure
Leinster Senior Club Hurling Championship (3): 1971, 1973, 1977
Wexford Senior Club Hurling Championship (8): 1967, 1971, 1972, 1973, 1974, 1977, 1979, 1980

Wexford
Leinster Senior Hurling Championship (1): 1970
All-Ireland Under-21 Hurling Championship (1): 1965
Leinster Under-21 Hurling Championship (2): 1965, 1966

References

1946 births
Living people
Rathnure hurlers
Wexford inter-county hurlers